John Harun Mwau (born 24 June 1948) is a Kenyan businessman and politician.  He is the former Member of Parliament for Kilome Constituency.    He was the first director of the defunct Kenya Anti-Corruption Authority but was removed after a year when a tribunal ruled that he was unfit to hold the office.

Harun Mwau  is the founding chairman Party of Independent Candidates of Kenya (PICK) and ran as a Presidential Candidate in the 1992 Kenyan general election. Mwau polled 10,449 votes and later petitioned the High Court to declare him the only validly nominated candidate, as other candidates did not present the list of supporters nominating them using the correct paper size.  The case was dismissed by the High Court.

Prior to his career as a politician, he was a sports shooter and competed at the 1968 Summer Olympics and the 1972 Summer Olympics.

Controversy

Drug trafficking accusations 
In 2011, the United States designated Harun Mwau, who was MP at the time, on a list of seven “narcotic kingpins”.  Under this legislation,  American assets  are frozen, and access to the American financial system is denied. Harun Mwau has been cited as one of "the more powerful and active narcotics traffickers in the region" by the Director of the Office of Foreign Assets Control of the US Department of Treasury. Harun Mwau has been denying the charges and says that the United States government is attempting to seize his businesses, which are estimated to be worth $750 million.

Litigations 
In 2005, Harun Mwau sued  the Nation Media group for an alleged defamatory article  which  implicated him  in a  tax evasion scandal. The same year, he filed four suits against the senior executives and editors of Kenya's leading media houses to permanently bar the media from publishing reports linking him to drug trafficking. In 2011, Harun Mwau  sued the United States Ambassador Michael Ranneberger for associating him to narcotic drug trafficking.  In 2013, he sued a student over a Facebook post linking him to the murder of Internal Security minister, George Saitoti. In 2014, he sued the author of a report from the International Peace Institute, where his designation by the US government as a foreign narcotics kingpin was mentioned. In 2017, he sued the  authors of two blog posts which link him to a businessman believed to be close to Colombia's drug cartels. The same year, he sued the  Kenyan Independent Electoral and Boundaries Commission for "intending to conduct a fresh presidential election without nominations".

2013 election
Mwau vied for senatorial position for Makueni in 2013 Election.  He was defeated by Mutula Kilonzo

2013 Makueni by-election
Mutula Kilonzo Jnr a son of former senator Mutula Kilonzo of Wiper Democratic Party won 163,232 votes to win the Makueni Senate seat in the 2013 by-election.   Mwau therefore has lost senatorial election to father and son in a span of 5 month.

Makueni by-election, the first after the 4 March 2013 general election, was occasioned by the death of Mutula Kilonzo on 27 April 2013. The voter turnout was 60.4%.

See also 
Corruption in Kenya
Kenya Anti-Corruption Authority
Kenya Anti-Corruption Commission
Ethics and Anti-Corruption Commission

References

External links
 The Story of John Harun Mwau 

1948 births
Living people
Kenyan politicians
Kenyan businesspeople
Kenyan male sport shooters
Olympic shooters of Kenya
Shooters at the 1968 Summer Olympics
Shooters at the 1972 Summer Olympics
Commonwealth Games competitors for Kenya
Shooters at the 1974 British Commonwealth Games
Shooters at the 1982 Commonwealth Games
Kenyan sportsperson-politicians